Thomaz Bellucci chose to not defend his 2009 title.
Laurent Recouderc won in the final 6–0, 6–2, against Santiago Ventura.

Seeds

Draw

Final four

Top half

Bottom half

External links
 Main Draw
 Qualifying Draw

2009 Singles
Rabat,Singles